The National Republican Navy was the navy of the Italian Social Republic, a World War II German puppet state in Italy.

History

The Marina Nazionale Repubblicana was formally created in late September 1943, following the establishment of the Italian Social Republic. 
Most of the Regia Marina fleet, however, after the Armistice of Cassibile between Italy and the Allies on 3 September 1943, had sailed to Allied-controlled ports (chiefly Malta), and the few ships that remained in Italian ports, most of them undergoing maintenance or repair, were either scuttled or captured by the German forces and incorporated into the Kriegsmarine. The MNR was thus left without a real fleet; even ships abandoned during construction in Northern Italian shipyards (among them many Gabbiano-class corvettes and Ariete-class torpedo boats) were completed for the German Kriegsmarine, that refused to transfer any of them to the MNR.

The first Chief of Staff of the MNR was Admiral Antonio Legnani, who however died in a car crash less than a month after the creation of the MNR. He was succeeded by Captain Ferruccio Ferrini.
Junio Valerio Borghese's Decima Flottiglia MAS was formally part of the MNR, but it operated as a de facto independent unit under Borghese's undisputed leadership. Ferrini did not tolerate this independence; he accused Borghese of having contacts with the Allies and the anti-Communist partisans, and of conspiring to depose Mussolini and replace him at the head of the RSI. In January 1944 Borghese was summoned by Mussolini and placed under arrest, but this immediately brought the Decima MAS personnel on the verge of mutiny; the situation settled after Borghese was released, following German intervention.

The fleet of the MNR never amounted to more than a small number of MAS, submarine chasers, midget submarines and assault craft, the latter operated by the Decima Flottiglia MAS. Part of the personnel recruited by the MNR served on Kriegsmarine ships in the Mediterranean, whereas others manned coastal batteries in Northern Italy. Other personnel fought on land alongside the National Republican Army and the Wehrmacht

Size and ships
The Marina Nazionale Repubblicana only reached a twentieth the size of the Allied Italian fleet, and consisted of nine motor torpedo boats (two large and seven small), dozens of MTSM small motor torpedo boats and MTM explosive motorboats. The National Republican Navy also operated fifteen CB-class midget submarines (ten in the Adriatic and five in the Black Sea) and one larger submarine, CM 1, as well as the auxiliary submarine chasers Equa and Antonio Landi, the trawlers Cefalo and Pegaso, and a flotilla of minesweepers based in Venice.

An unknown number of MTSMs were active with the navy of the Italian Social Republic. Most of their operations took place in the Adriatic sea, sometimes with mixed Italian and German crews.

Of their CB midget class submarines, five were initially given to the Italian Social Republic by Germany, but later ten more boats were transferred by the Germans to the RSI Navy and served in the Adriatic. One was used for spare parts, seven were sunk and two were captured by the Allies.

Operational history

Due to its small size, activity by MNR mainly consisted in coastal patrolling and minelaying operations, as well as some limited offensive activity against Allied shipping with MAS and assault craft.

The only success by a MNR vessel came on 16 April 1945, a few weeks before its dissolution, when one MTM hit and heavily damaged the French destroyer Trombe off Liguria, Italy. In late April 1945, the MNR ceased to exist following the liberation of Northern Italy and the fall of the Italian Social Republic.

Many MNR and Decima MAS personnel stationed in Istria became victims of the Foibe massacres between April and May 1945.

List of ships
CB-class submarines:
CB1: 27 January 1941–August 1944, scuttled
CB2: 27 January 1941–August 1944, scuttled
CB3: 10 May 1941–August 1944, scuttled
CB4: 10 May 1941–August 1944, scuttled
CB6: 10 May 1941–August 1944, scuttled
CB7: 1 August 1943—?, scrapped
CB13: Late 1943–23 March 1945, sunk
CB14: Late 1943–?, sunk
CB15: Late 1943–?, sunk
CB16: Late 1943–?, captured by British forces
CB17: Late 1943–3 April 1945, sunk
CB18: Late 1943–31 March 1945, sunk
CB19: Late 1943–1947, scrapped
CB20: Late 1943–?, captured by Yugoslavia
CB21: Late 1943– 29 April 1945, rammed by a Marinefährprahm.
VAS-class patrol boats:
VAS 207
VAS 225
VAS 238
VAS 252
VAS 253
VAS 255
VAS 263
MTSM-class motorboat
MTSM 204
MTSM 230
MTSM 234
MTSM 268
MS-class speedboat
MS 16
MS 34
MS 41
MS 71
MS 76
MAS-class 
MAS 433

MAS 502 January 22, 1944–?
MAS 504 26 October 1943–?
MAS 505 April 10, 1944–?
MAS 525 October 1943–?
MAS 531 2 November 1943–?
MAS 544 November 5, 1943–?
MAS 549 1944–?
MAS 551 1944–?
MAS 553 November 1943–?
MAS 554
MAS 556 January 22, 1944–?
MAS 557 11 October 1943–?
MAS 558 November 8, 1943–?
MAS 561 November 8, 1943–?
MAS 562 November 8, 1943–?

Ranks

Commissioned officer ranks
The rank insignia of commissioned officers.

Other ranks
The rank insignia of non-commissioned officers and enlisted personnel.

References

Disbanded navies
Naval history of World War II
Military units and formations established in 1943
Military units and formations disestablished in 1945
Italian Social Republic
Naval history of Italy
Military units and formations of Italy in World War II